Moana Moo Caille (born 13 August 1988 in Le Port-Marly) is a French racing cyclist who represents France in bicycle motocross (BMX). He competed in the men's BMX event at the 2012 Summer Olympics.

References

External links
 
 
 
 

1988 births
Living people
BMX riders
French male cyclists
Olympic cyclists of France
Cyclists at the 2012 Summer Olympics
Cyclists from Réunion
Sportspeople from Yvelines
Cyclists from Île-de-France